American record producer, songwriter, and multi-instrumentalist Greg Kurstin has written, produced, engineered, and performed on albums and tracks for a wide range of recording artists, spanning from pop, rock, to indie, jazz and Christmas music. In addition, he has written and produced records as Action Figure Party and as part of the musical duos Geggy Tah and the Bird and the Bee. He has won 8 Grammy Awards, including Producer of the Year in 2017 and 2018. 

Immediately after graduating from The New School for Jazz and Contemporary Music in New York City, Kurstin relocated to his hometown of Los Angeles and collaborated with singer-songwriter Tommy Jordan to form Geggy Tah. In 1993, Geggy Tah signed to David Byrne's Luaka Bop label. They released three studio albums:Grand Opening (1994), Sacred Cow (1996), and Into the Oh (2001). In 1999, Kurstin was signed to Verve Records and released an eponymous album under a pseudonymous name, Action Figure Party. He formed The Bird and the Bee in 2006 with Inara George. They have released four albums and seven EPS since their 2007 debut.

In the early 2000s, Kurstin began to write and produce tracks for recording artists and bands including Peaches, All Saints, P!nk, the Flaming Lips, Kylie Minogue and Lily Allen.  He won three Ivor Novello Awards for his work on Allen's double-platinum It's Not Me, It's You in 2010.  He has since been nominated for 14 Grammy Awards, including Producer of the Year (in 2010 and 2014), Record of the Year and Song of the Year (for Kelly Clarkson's "Stronger (What Doesn't Kill You)"  (2011), and Record of the Year for Sia's "Chandelier" in 2014. In addition to his Producer of the Year wins in 2017 and 2018, he has won Grammys for Song of the Year, Record of the Year, Album of the Year, Best Engineered Album, and Best Alternative Music Album.

Kurstin has worked with artists including Adele, Beck, Foo Fighters, Liam Gallagher, Kendrick Lamar, Paul McCartney, and Tegan and Sara as well as Clarkson, P!nk, and Sia.  He co-wrote and produced three songs on the Adele album 25, including its first single,"Hello," released in 2015. He teamed up again with Adele in 2021, co-writing and producing "Easy on Me", the debut single from her album 30.

Written and produced songs

2000 to 2006

2007 to 2011

2012 to 2017

2018 to 2023

Songs written and produced as part of an ensemble

References 

 
Discographies of American artists
Pop music discographies
Production discographies